The Wigram Baronetcy, of Walthamstow House in the County of Essex, is a title in the Baronetage of the United Kingdom. It was created on 30 October 1805 for Robert Wigram, a successful shipbuilding merchant and politician, representing Fowey and Wexford Borough in the House of Commons. The second Baronet also represented Wexford Borough in Parliament. He assumed in 1832 by Royal licence the surname of Fitzwygram. The fourth Baronet was a Lieutenant-General in the army and sat as a Conservative Member of Parliament for South Hampshire and Fareham.

Sir Joseph Wigram, James Wigram, Joseph Cotton Wigram, Loftus Wigram and George Wigram, younger sons of the first Baronet, all gained distinction. Civil servant and diplomat Ralph Wigram was the grandson of Joseph Cotton Wigram. Clive Wigram, 1st Baron Wigram, was the grandson of Reverend William Pitt Wigram, ninth and youngest son of the first Baronet.

Wigram baronets, of Walthamstow (1805)
Sir Robert Wigram, 1st Baronet (1743–1830)
Sir Robert Fitzwygram, 2nd Baronet (1773–1843)
Sir Robert Fitzwygram, 3rd Baronet (1813–1873)
Sir Frederick Wellington John Fitzwygram, 4th Baronet (1823–1904)
Sir Frederick Loftus Francis Fitzwygram, 5th Baronet (1884–1920)
Sir Edgar Thomas Ainger Wigram, 6th Baronet (1864–1935)
Sir Clifford Woolmore Wigram, 7th Baronet (1911–2000)
Sir Edward Robert Woolmore Wigram, 8th Baronet (1913–2003)
Sir John Woolmore Wigram, 9th Baronet (born 1957)

The heir apparent to the baronetcy is James Woolmore Wigram (born 1997), eldest son of the 9th Baronet.

Arms

See also
Baron Wigram

References

Kidd, Charles, Williamson, David (editors). Debrett's Peerage and Baronetage (1990 edition). New York: St Martin's Press, 1990.

Wigram
1805 establishments in the United Kingdom